The 1989 Bavarian Tennis Championships was an Association of Tennis Professionals men's tennis tournament held in Munich, 
West Germany. The tournament was held from 1 May through 7 May 1989. Andrei Chesnokov won the singles title.

Finals

Singles

 Andrei Chesnokov defeated  Martin Střelba 5–7, 7–6, 6–2
 It was Chesnokov's 2nd title of the year and the 4th of his career.

Doubles

 Javier Sánchez /  Balázs Taróczy defeated  Peter Doohan /  Laurie Warder 7–6, 6–7, 7–6
 It was Sánchez's 1st title of the year and the 5th of his career. It was Taróczy's 1st title of the year and the 26th of his career.

References

External links 
 ATP tournament profile
 

Bavarian Tennis Championships
Bavarian International Tennis Championships
 
Bavarian Tennis Championships
Bavarian Tennis Championships
German